Stadionul Șoimii is a multi-use stadium in Pâncota, Romania. It is used mostly for football matches and is the home ground of Podgoria Pâncota. It was the home ground of Șoimii Pâncota between 1938 and 2016. The stadium holds 2,000 people.

References

Football venues in Romania
Buildings and structures in Arad County